Dicrodiplosis is a genus of gall midges in the family Cecidomyiidae. There are about 15 described species in Dicrodiplosis.

Species
These 15 species belong to the genus Dicrodiplosis:

 Dicrodiplosis antennata Felt, 1912 i c g
 Dicrodiplosis bifurcata Grover, 1979 c g
 Dicrodiplosis californica Felt, 1912 i c g b (mealybug-destroying predaceous gall midge)
 Dicrodiplosis coccidarum Felt, 1911 c g
 Dicrodiplosis cylindriformis Kashyap, 1988 c g
 Dicrodiplosis fasciata Kieffer, 1895 c g
 Dicrodiplosis fulva (Felt, 1915) c g
 Dicrodiplosis guatemalensis Felt i c g
 Dicrodiplosis kimberleyensis Harris, 1968 c g
 Dicrodiplosis manihoti Harris, 1981 c g
 Dicrodiplosis marikovskii Fedotova, 2006 c g
 Dicrodiplosis minuta Shinji, 1939 c g
 Dicrodiplosis multifila (Felt, 1908) c
 Dicrodiplosis pseudococci (Felt, 1914) c g
 Dicrodiplosis quercina Felt, 1907 i c g

Data sources: i = ITIS, c = Catalogue of Life, g = GBIF, b = Bugguide.net

References

Further reading

 
 
 
 
 

Cecidomyiinae
Articles created by Qbugbot
Cecidomyiidae genera